Campton may refer to:
 Campton, Bedfordshire, England
 Campton, Georgia, USA
 Campton, Kentucky, USA
 Campton, New Hampshire, USA
 Campton, South Carolina, USA
 Campton Hills, Illinois, USA